Joseph Merrill may refer to:

Joseph F. Merrill (1868–1952), member of the Quorum of the Twelve Apostles of the Church of Jesus Christ of Latter-day Saints
Joseph Merrill (sheriff), sheriff of Carroll County circa 1901